Stonebreaker is a surname. Notable people with the surname include:

Michael Stonebraker (born 1943), computer scientist 
Mike Stonebreaker (born 1967), American football player
Steve Stonebreaker (1938–1995), American football player

See also
The Stonebreaker, painting by Henry Wallis
Stonebreakers Hut, road in the Isle of Man